Cyrtandra baileyi is a species of flowering plant in the family Gesneriaceae, native to Queensland, Australia. Male golden bowerbirds (Prionodura newtoniana) use its flowers to decorate their bowers.

References

baileyi
Endemic flora of Australia
Flora of Queensland
Plants described in 1890
Taxa named by Ferdinand von Mueller